Procambarus nechesae, sometimes called the Neches crayfish, is a species of crustacean in the family Cambaridae. It is endemic to Texas and is listed as a species of Least Concern on the IUCN Red List.

References

Cambaridae
Endemic fauna of Texas
Freshwater crustaceans of North America
Taxonomy articles created by Polbot
Crustaceans described in 1990
Taxa named by Horton H. Hobbs Jr.